Animal welfare and rights in Canada is about the laws concerning and treatment of nonhuman animals in Canada. Canada has been considered to have weak animal welfare protections by the organization World Animal Protection. The vast majority of Canadians are for further animal protections, according to a poll conducted on behalf of Mercy for Animals.

Legislation
Sections 444 to 447 of Canada's Criminal Code constitute Canada's primary federal animal protection  legislation.  The Code prohibits causing "unnecessary pain, suffering or injury to an animal or bird" and "causing damage or injury by wilful neglect".

The Criminal Code includes special protections for cattle, horses, mules, donkeys, pigs, sheep, and goats, but excludes chicken and fish, which make up the majority of animals raised and killed for food in Canada. The federal Health of Animals Act concerns the welfare of animals during transport and loading.  This law prohibits overcrowding and sets a maximum amount of time that an animal can be transported without food, water, or rest: 52 hours for ruminants, 36 hours for monogastric animals.  The federal Meat Inspection Act sets down regulations on inspections and slaughter.  The law permits electric prods and does not require chickens and domesticated rabbits to be unconscious before slaughter.  In 2014, Canada enacted a ban on gestation crates.

Canadian provinces vary in their provisions for farm animal welfare.  However, animal agriculture is generally exempt from anti-cruelty and duty of care provisions of provincial animal welfare legislation.

There is no federal legislation specifically regulating animal testing.  In Ontario, Manitoba, Newfoundland, Labrador, Alberta, and Saskatchewan animals used in research are exempt from duty of care and/or prohibitions on causing distress.

In 2014 and again in 2020, Canada received a D out of possible grades A,B,C,D,E,F,G on World Animal Protection's Animal Protection Index.

Animals used for food

Animal agriculture
In 2015, Canada slaughtered 660.96 million chickens, a steady increase from 621.82 million in 2007; 2.48 million cattle (on federally inspected farms), down from 3.61 million in 2004; and 20.41 million hogs.  Statistics on the number of aquatic animals raised and killed are not forthcoming, but in 2010 Canadian aquaculture produced 160,924 tons of aquatic animals.

In 2014 Canada had 1.4 million head of dairy cattle.  In 2014, there were 1007 registered egg farms in Canada with an average of 20,192 hens each, for a total of 20.33 million egg-laying hens.  According to a 2012 document by the Society for the Prevention of Cruelty to Animals of British Columbia, over 90% of Canadian egg-laying hens live in battery cages.

In addition to battery cages, extreme confinement of calves in veal crates is legal in Canada, as is the removal of farm animal body parts (for instance, debeaking and castration) without anesthesia.

Vegetarianism and veganism
In a 2015 poll commissioned by the Vancouver Humane Society, 8% of 1507 respondents identified as vegetarian or mostly vegetarian and 25% said they are trying to eat less meat.  12% of respondents 18-34 identified as vegetarian or mostly pesco-vegetarian, as opposed to 5% of those 55 and up.  The study did not measure the number of vegans. In 2018, A Dalhousie University study led by Sylvain Charlebois revealed that over 6.4 million Canadians limit the amount of meat they eat, and number will likely grow.

Animal testing
According to the Canadian Council for Animal 2015 Animal Data Report, 3.57 million animals were used in experiments.  76,646 of these animals experienced "severe pain near, at, or above the pain tolerance threshold of unanesthetized conscious animals"

Testing cosmetics on animals is legal in Canada.  However, in December 2015 a bill to ban testing cosmetics on animals as well as the sale of cosmetics tested on animals was introduced to the Canadian Senate.

Animals used for clothing
In 2014, over 3 million animals were raised on 230 mink and 50 fox fur farms.  No federal laws regulate fur farms specifically, and only Newfoundland and Labrador have enacted the National Farm Animal Care Council's codes of practice for mink and fox farming.

A particularly controversial animal issue in Canada is seal hunting, in which seals are killed for their fur and meat.  The seals are killed by being clubbed or shot; however, evidence shows that many must be clubbed many times before death, are impaled with hooks and dragged while still conscious, and are hooked, knifed open, and skinned without being checked for consciousness.  In 2015 the Canadian government authorized the killing of up to 468,000 seals.

Animal activism
A number of major international animal welfare and rights groups are active in Canada, including Mercy for Animals (MFA), People for the Ethical Treatment of Animals, Direct Action Everywhere, and Humane Society International.

Canada also has homegrown animal activist groups. In 2010 Toronto Pig Save began the international Save Movement in which activists stop trucks transporting animals to slaughter and hold vigils for them.  The Canadian Coalition for Farm Animals works to educate Canadians about farm animal welfare issues, promote reductions in the consumption of animal products, and push for legislative changes including bans on battery cages and gestation crates.  Similar to the American Animal Legal Defense Fund, Canada's Animal Justice lobbies for stronger animal welfare legislation and litigates on behalf of animals.

Recent undercover investigations of animal farms in Canada include a 2014 MFA investigation of a dairy farm in British Columbia, in which workers were filmed kicking, beating, and hanging cows; a 2014 MFA investigation of a veal farm in Quebec where workers were filmed kicking, punching, and force-feeding calves, among other abuses; and a 2015 MFA investigation of a Hybrid Turkeys farm in which workers were filmed kicking and throwing turkeys, crushing their spines with bolt cutters, and beating them with shovels and metal rods, leaving them to die slowly.  Following the investigation Hybrid Turkeys was found guilty of animal cruelty and fined 5,600 Canadian dollars.

See also
 List of animal rights advocates
 Timeline of animal welfare and rights
 Timeline of animal welfare and rights in the United States
Timeline of animal welfare and rights in Europe
 Abolitionism (animal rights)
 Universal Declaration on Animal Welfare

References